Hyacinth Gabriel Tungutalum (14 August 1946 – 7 April 2009) was an Australian politician and the first Indigenous Australian to be elected to the Northern Territory parliament.

|}

A traditional owner on the Tiwi Islands, north of Darwin, Tungutalum was elected as the Country Liberal Party (CLP) member for the Northern Territory Legislative Assembly's Electoral division of Tiwi at the 1974 Northern Territory election, serving until his retirement at the 1977 election.

Tungutalum was heavily involved in Australian rules football in the Tiwi Islands and served as President of the Tiwi Islands Football League for many years, winning the ATSIC National Administrator of the Year Award in 1995 for his services.

Tungutalum died in 2009 of a heart attack.

References

Sources
 Lee, D. & Barfoot, M. (1996) NTFL, Northern Territory Football League: Darwin. .

1946 births
2009 deaths
Members of the Northern Territory Legislative Assembly
Country Liberal Party members of the Northern Territory Legislative Assembly
Indigenous Australian politicians
20th-century Australian politicians
Tiwi Islands people